The thermo-galvanometer is an instrument for measuring small electric currents. It was invented by William Duddell about 1900. The following is a description of the instrument taken from  a trade catalog of Cambridge Scientific Instrument Company dated 1905: 
For a long time the need of an instrument capable of accurately measuring small alternating currents has been keenly felt. The high resistance and self-induction of the coils of instruments of the electro-magnetic type frequently prevent their use. Electro-static instruments as at present constructed are not altogether suitable for measuring very small currents, unless a sufficient potential difference is available.

The thermo-galvanometer designed by Mr W. Duddell can be used for the measurement of extremely small currents to a high degree of accuracy. It has practically no self-induction or capacity and can therefore be used on a circuit of any frequency (even up to 120,000~ per sec.) and currents as small as twenty micro-amperes can be readily measured by it . It is equally correct on continuous and alternating currents. It can therefore be accurately standardized by continuous current and used without error on circuits of any frequency or wave-form.

The principle of the thermo-galvanometer is simple. The instrument consists of a resistance which is heated by the current to be measured, the heat from the resistance falling on the thermo-junction of a Boys radio-micrometer. The rise in temperature of the lower junction of the thermo-couple produces a current in the loop which is deflected by the magnetic field against the torsion of the quartz fibre.

References
 Vladimir Karapetoff, Experimental Electrical Engineering and Manual for Electrical Testing for Engineers and for Students in Engineering Laboratories. Volume. 1 John Wiley & Sons, Inc. 1910. page 70
 Cambridge Scientific Instrument Company Ltd. 1905 trade catalog.

Galvanometers
Historical scientific instruments